The Eurasian Economic Union (EAEU or EEU) is an economic union of some post-Soviet states located in Eurasia. The Treaty on the Eurasian Economic Union was signed on 29 May 2014 by the leaders of Belarus, Kazakhstan, and Russia, and came into force on 1 January 2015. Treaties aiming for Armenia's and Kyrgyzstan's accession to the Eurasian Economic Union were signed on 9 October and 23 December 2014, respectively. Armenia's accession treaty came into force on 2 January 2015. Kyrgyzstan's accession treaty came into effect on 6 August 2015. Kyrgyzstan participated in the EAEU from the day of its establishment as an acceding state.

The Eurasian Economic Union has an integrated single market of 184 million people and a gross domestic product of over $1.9 trillion. The EAEU encourages the free movement of goods and services, and provides for common policies in the macroeconomic sphere, transport, industry and agriculture, energy, foreign trade and investment, customs, technical regulation, competition, and antitrust regulation. Provisions for a single currency and greater integration are envisioned for the future. The union operates through supranational and intergovernmental institutions. The Supreme Eurasian Economic Council is the supreme body of the Union, consisting of the Heads of the Member States. The second level of intergovernmental institutions is represented by the Eurasian Intergovernmental Council (consisting of the Heads of the governments of member states). The day-to-day work of the EAEU is done through the Eurasian Economic Commission, the executive body of the Union. There is also a judicial body – the Court of the EAEU.

History

Proposal
In the 1990s, Russia and the Central Asian republics were weakened economically and faced declines in GDP as a result of the collapse of the Soviet Union. The member states of the union underwent economic reforms and privatisation. The process of Eurasian integration began immediately after the break-up of the Soviet Union. When the USSR began to fall in 1991, the presidents of Belarus, Kazakhstan and Russia of the founding republics signed the Belavezha Accords on 8 December 1991, declaring that the Soviet Union would cease to exist and proclaimed the Commonwealth of Independent States in its place.

In 1994, during a speech at Moscow State University, the first President of Kazakhstan, Nursultan Nazarbayev, suggested the idea of creating a "Eurasian Union" as a regional trade bloc in order to connect to and profit from the growing economies of Europe and East Asia. The vision would be to simplify the free flow of goods across Eurasia. The idea was quickly seen as a way to bolster trade, boost investment in Central Asia, Armenia and Belarus, and serve as a complement to the Eastern Partnership.

Founding treaties (1990s)

During the 1990s, the Eurasian integration process was slow, possibly due to the economic crisis experienced after the dissolution of the Soviet Union and the size of the countries involved (Russia, Belarus and Kazakhstan cover an area of about 20 million km2). As a result, numerous treaties have been signed by member states to establish the regional trade bloc gradually.

In 1995, Belarus, Kazakhstan, Russia, and later acceding states Kyrgyzstan and Tajikistan signed the first agreements on the establishment of a Customs Union. Its purpose was to gradually lead the way toward the creation of open borders without passport controls between member states.

In 1996, Belarus, Kazakhstan, Russia and Kyrgyzstan signed the Treaty on Increased Integration in the Economic and Humanitarian Fields to begin economic integration between countries to allow for the creation of common markets for goods, services, capital, labour, and developing single transport, energy and information systems.

In 1999, Belarus, Kazakhstan, Russia, Kyrgyzstan and Tajikistan signed the Treaty on the Customs Union and the Single Economic Space by clarifying the goals and policies the states would undertake in order to form the Eurasian Customs Union and the Single Economic Space.

Eurasian Economic Community (2000–2014)

To promote further economic integration and more cooperation, in 2000 Belarus, Kazakhstan, Russia, Kyrgyzstan and Tajikistan established the Eurasian Economic Community (EurAsEC) which Uzbekistan joined in 2006. 
The treaty established a common market for its member states. The Eurasian Economic Community was modelled on the European Economic Community. The two had a comparable population size of 171 million and 169 million, respectively.

A Treaty on a Single Economic Space by Belarus, Kazakhstan, Russia and Ukraine was signed in 2003 and ratified in 2004, but the process was stalled after the Orange revolution.

In 2007, Belarus, Kazakhstan and Russia signed an agreement to create a Customs Union between the three countries.

Establishing the customs union and single market (2010–2014)

The Customs Union of Belarus, Kazakhstan, and Russia (now the Eurasian Customs Union) came into existence on 1 January 2010. The Customs Union's priorities were the elimination of intra-bloc tariffs, establishing a common external tariff policy and the elimination of non-tariff barriers. It was launched as a first step towards forming a broader single market inspired by the European Union, with the objective of forming an alliance between former Soviet states. The member states planned to continue with economic integration and were set to remove all customs borders between each other after July 2011.

On 1 January 2012, the three states established the Eurasian Economic Space which ensures the effective functioning of a single market for goods, services, capital and labour, and to establish coherent industrial, transport, energy and agricultural policies. The agreement included a roadmap for future integration and established the Eurasian Economic Commission (modelled on the European Commission). The Eurasian Economic Commission serves as the regulatory agency for the Eurasian Customs Union, the Single Economic Space and the Eurasian Economic Union.

Treaty on the Eurasian Economic Union

In 2011, the then-Prime Minister of Russia, Vladimir Putin, announced his support for Nursultan Nazarbayev's idea for the creation of a Eurasian Economic Union. On 18 November 2011, the presidents of Belarus, Kazakhstan, and Russia signed an agreement setting a target of establishing the Eurasian Economic Union by 2015. The member states put together a joint commission on fostering closer economic ties.

On 29 May 2014, the presidents of Kazakhstan, Belarus and Russia signed the treaty on the Eurasian Economic Union, which came into effect on 1 January 2015. The presidents of Armenia and Kyrgyzstan were also present at the signing ceremony. Russian president Vladimir Putin stated, "Today we have created a powerful, attractive centre of economic development, a big regional market that unites more than 170 million people." Kazakh politicians emphasized the Eurasian Economic Union was not intended to be a political bloc, but a purely economic union. Bakytzhan Sagintayev, the first deputy prime minister of Kazakhstan and lead negotiator, said, "We are not creating a political organisation; we are forming a purely economic union." He further stated "it is a pragmatic means to get benefits. We don't meddle into what Russia is doing politically, and they cannot tell us what foreign policy to pursue." By October, the treaty had received parliamentary approval from all three states. On 9 October 2014, a Treaty to enlarge the EAEU to Armenia was signed. Kyrgyzstan signed the Treaty on 23 December 2014 and became a member of the Eurasian Union on 6 August 2015.

Structural evolution

Russian invasion of Ukraine (2022)

As a result of Russia's invasion of Ukraine, the US and EU placed sanctions upon Russia and Belarus. On March 10, 2022, Russia suspended exports of wheat, meslin, rye, barley, and corn to the Eurasian Economic Union to secure the country's food supplies. The ban was reversed on April 1, 2022, although other restrictions on the trade of foods were simultaneously introduced. On March 29 a Kazakh government official stated that Kazakhstan would abide by US and EU sanctions and would not facilitate any circumvention, despite its membership of the EAEU. The official explained that Kazakhstan does not wish to be targeted by secondary sanctions, and instead will be seeking to expand its cooperation with the EU.

Geography

The Eurasian Economic Union is located at the eastern end of Europe, bounded by the Arctic in the north, the Pacific Ocean to the east and East Asia, the Middle East and part of Central Asia to the south. It lies between latitudes 39° and 82°N and longitudes 19°E and 169°W. The union extends across much of northern Eurasia. Its member states cover an area of over 20,000,000 square kilometers, which is approximately 15% of the world's land surface.

The Eastern European Plain encompasses Belarus and most of European Russia. The plain is mostly mountain-free and comprises several plateaus. Russia's northernmost regions are tundra. The Russian Tundra is located on the coastline with the Arctic and is known for its total darkness in the winter. Taiga reaches Russia's southern borders in Siberia and accounts for 60% of the country. Towards the Ural Mountains and in northern Kazakhstan, the climate is mostly temperate. Southwestern Russia and Kazakhstan are mostly steppe. The Kazakh steppe covers one-third of Kazakhstan and is the world's largest dry steppe region. Armenia is mostly mountainous and its climate is continental. The landlocked country shares no direct border with other members states. It is located in the southwestern part of Asia, occupying the northeastern part of the Armenian Plateau, and is located between the Caucasus and the Near East.

A large number of lakes and rivers are found in the Eurasian Economic Union. Major lakes include Ladoga and Onega, two of the largest lakes in Europe. The largest and most prominent of the union's bodies of fresh water is Lake Baikal, the world's deepest, purest, oldest and most capacious fresh water lake. The Baikal lake alone contains over one-fifth of the world's fresh surface water. Russia is second only to Brazil in volume of the total renewable water resources. Of the union's numerous rivers, the Volga is the most famous, not only because it is the longest in Europe, but also because of its major role in history. In Siberia the Ob, Yenisey, Lena and Amur are among the longest rivers in the world.

The Eurasian Economic Union's highest peak is the Khan Tengri in the Tian Shan mountains, Kazakhstan, 7,010 m above sea level. The lowest point in the Eurasian Economic Union is the Karagiye Depression in Kazakhstan. Kazakhstan's Caspian shore includes some of the lowest elevations on Earth. According to a 2005 estimate by the United Nations, forests cover 40% of Belarus. 11,000 lakes and many water streams are found in the country. Russia is known for its extensive mineral and energy resources, the largest reserves in the world, making it the world's largest producer of oil and natural gas.

According to estimates, the Eurasian Economic Union's population of 176 million people is mostly urbanized, with Russia and Belarus having over 70% of their population living in urban areas. In Armenia over 64% of the population lives in urban areas. Kazakhstan's urban population comprises 54% of the country's total population.

Membership

The treaty establishing the Eurasian Economic Union was formally signed by three states which were part of the former Soviet Union: Belarus, Kazakhstan, and Russia. Agreements to enlarge the EAEU to the other post-Soviet states of Armenia and Kyrgyzstan were signed on 9 October and 23 December 2014, respectively. For Kyrgyzstan, facilitation of labour migration regulations with Russia was seen as the main benefit of joining the Eurasian Economic Union. The population migration indicator had an inverse dependance with GDP per capita, consumer price index, minimum wage, and unemployment rate.

Armenia announced its decision to join the Eurasian Customs Union in September 2013. President Serj Sargsyan announced the decision after talks with his Russian counterpart President Vladimir Putin in Moscow. The treaty enlarging the EAEU to Armenia was signed on 9 October 2014. By signing this contract, Armenia has accepted corresponding application, and thereby gained access to the EAEU single market with a population of 170 million citizens. Armenia is the only country of the EAEU that has no common border with the other member states of the union. Georgia guaranteed a free transit corridor for exporting its goods to the Eurasian Economic Union, Armenian deputy economic minister Emil Tarasyan stated.

Moldova was granted Observer Status in April 2017.

Uzbekistan and Cuba became observer members on 11 December 2020. After the presidential elections in December 2021, Uzbekistan is expected to obtain full membership by 2022 or 2023.

Presidency 
Each year, a Member State is elected chairman to head the Union. Chairmanship is passed from country to country in alphabetical order in the Russian language. Kyrgyzstan holds the chairmanship until 31 December 2022.

Enlargement 

Russian President Vladimir Putin has stated that his goal was to enlarge the Customs Union to all post-Soviet states, excluding the three Baltic EU member states. According to The Guardian newspaper, Putin's plan is for the Eurasian Union to grow into a "powerful, supra-national union" of sovereign states like the European Union, uniting economies, legal systems, customs services, and military capabilities to form a bridge between Europe and Asia to balance the EU and the U.S.

In May 2015, an integration agreement was signed between the Russian Federation and South Ossetia. If South Ossetia were to join, it would be by acceding to the Russian Federation.

Tajikistan was formally invited to join the union and has expressed its interest in acceding. It is recognized as a potential candidate and membership negotiations are underway. In 2015, further efforts were made to integrate Tajikistan into the EAEU.

Uzbekistan has been hesitant to join the Economic Union, with Uzbek officials making opposing claims on the prospect of integration. Originally, the country preferred not to pursue economic and political integration. Russian officials have stated that integration with the country would be slow and analysts state that as Russian influence and trade increases in Kyrgyzstan and Tajikistan it may persuade Uzbekistan to join in the future. Uzbekistan began its integration process when Russia announced it would write off US$865 million off debt owed by the country. Uzbekistan joined the CIS Free Trade Area in 2014, meaning it has free trade with EAEU member states. According to some sources, Uzbekistan does not intend to become a full member of the EAEU, due to Uzbekistan's neutrality which is enshrined in the country's legislation. In March 2020, Uzbekistan announced that it wished to become a Eurasian Union observer state.

Moldova, Ukraine and Georgia have been offered by both the European Union and the Eurasian Economic Union to join their integration unions. All three countries signed Association Agreements with the EU on 21 March 2014. However, break-away regions of Moldova (Transnistria), Ukraine (Donetsk and Luhansk) and Georgia (South Ossetia and Abkhazia) have expressed a desire to join the Eurasian Customs Union and integrate into the Eurasian Economic Union. Association Agreements with the EU are exclusionary to EAEU observer status, as in 2017 Moldova became the EAEU's first observer state and has attended EAEU forums in years since.

Ukraine submitted an application to participate in the Eurasian Economic Union as an observer in August 2013. Viktor Yanukovych's decision to abandon an association agreement with the European Union and exclusively pursue integration with the EAEU was a key factor in the Euromaidan protests that ended his term as president of Ukraine followed by annexation of Crimea by Russia. The country's membership in the EAEU was seen by some analysts as the key to the success of the union as Ukraine has the second largest economy of any of the 15 former republics of the Soviet Union. With high tensions between Russia and Ukraine in the wake of the crisis, Ukraine decided to pursue integration with the EU.

Turkey was extended an invitation to join the EAEU by Kazakhstan's President Nursultan Nazarbayev on 6 June 2014 but the country prefers to join the EU.

Georgia's Prime Minister Bidzina Ivanishvili said in September 2013 he was studying the possibility of acceding to the Union, although he later clarified that Georgia's main strategy was still to integrate into the European Union. Russia's Prime Minister Dmitri Medvedev included Georgia as a prospective member in statements made in August 2013.

Politics and governance

The Eurasian Economic Union has sought to base its model on the European Union. All institutions carry out their work in compliance with the Treaty on the Eurasian Economic Commission (EEC) and the international agreements that provide the legal and regulatory framework of the Customs Union and the Single Economic Space.

Supreme Eurasian Economic Council

The Supreme Council, which is composed by the heads of state of the member states, makes important decisions for the union. It approves the budget and the distribution of the contribution of the Member States. The Supreme Council also determines the strategy, direction and prospects of integration and takes decisions aimed at achieving the goals of the union.

Eurasian Economic Commission

The Eurasian Commission was established as the supranational governing body of the Eurasian Economic Space on 1 January 2012. The commission was modelled on the European Commission. Its headquarters are in Moscow. The commission monitors subordinate branches and advisory bodies. Its departments were greatly expanded on 1 January 2015, and the number of international employees increased from 150 to 1,200.

The Eurasian Commission can take decisions on not only the customs policy of the union, but also on the macro-economy, the competition regulations, the energy policy and the fiscal policy of the Eurasian Economic Union. It has strict anti-corruption laws.

The Eurasian Economic Commission consists of two bodies: the Council and the Collegium.

Council
The council is composed of the Vice Prime Ministers of the member states. The council of the Commission oversees the integration processes in the Union, and is responsible for the overall management of the Eurasian Commission. It monitors the commission by approving the draft budget of the union, the maximum number of personnel, and the qualification requirements for the commission's employees. The council convenes once every quarter.

It also considers issues of customs cooperation, trade and development of Eurasian integration. The council regularly holds discussions on the important aspects of the EAEU and meets with business representatives of the member states.

Board
The Board is composed of ten commissioners, one of which is the chairman of the board. Each member state provides two commissioners to the Board of the Eurasian Commission who carry out the operational management and oversee the everyday work of the Eurasian Commission. All ten commissioners are appointed by the Supreme Eurasian Council for a four-year renewable term. The commissioners also receive the status of federal ministers in their respective countries.

The Board of the commission is the executive body of the commission. It convenes once every week at least, and is responsible for the day-to-day running of the Eurasian Economic Union. It has a wide range of activities, including monitoring the implementation of treaties, submitting annual progress reports and making recommendations. The Board also assists member states in the settlement of disputes, and carries out the draft of the union's budget. Part of its activities include being the intermediary between the departments of the commission and the heads of state of the member states.

A number of departments are headed by the commissioners. The lower rank staff is composed of 84% Russian officials, 10% Kazakhs and 6% Belarusians, proportional to the populations of the member states. The departments enable the Board of the Eurasian Commission to make decisions not only with regard to customs policies, but in such areas as macroeconomics, regulation of economic competition, energy policy and financial policy. The Commission departments are also involved in government procurement and labour migration control.

Parliament
As of 2015, the EAEU has no directly or indirectly elected body. In 2012, the creation of a Eurasian parliament was under consideration. However, it was considered too premature, and member states have instead begun harmonising national laws and legal codes.

Russian president Vladimir Putin has upheld the idea of creating a parliament for the union.

Court of the Eurasian Economic Union
The Court of the Eurasian Economic Union replaced the Court of the Eurasian Economic Community (EurAsEC Court) in 2015. It is in charge of dispute resolution and the interpretation of the legal order within the Eurasian Economic Union. Its headquarters is in Minsk. The court is composed of two judges from each member state, appointed by the heads of government of the member states. Their term of office is nine years.

Budget
The approved budget of the Eurasian Economic Union for 2015 exceeds 6.6 billion Russian roubles. The budget is formed from contributions by the union's member states. In 2015, 6 billion roubles will be allocated for the activity of the Eurasian Economic Commission, 463 million roubles will be set aside for financing the operation and further development of the EAEU integrated information system designed to promote and inform consumers of the EAEU's activities, and over 290 millions roubles will finance the activities of the Court of the EAEU.
Extra expenses of infrastructure and accommodation of commission workers are financed by Russia. 
In addition, Russia allocated US$1 billion to accelerate Kyrgyzstan's entry into the union. Another US$177 million was provided by Kazakhstan.

Economy

Formation and overview

The Treaty on Increased Integration in the Economic and Humanitarian Fields signed in 1996 laid the first foundation for economic convergence. The treaty ensured the creation of a permanent executive organ to oversee integration of states that later would be part of the EAEU. It served as the blueprint for the future common market for goods, services, capital and labour. The Single Economic Space established a single market across the territory of Belarus, Russia and Kazakhstan. In 2015 with the entry into force of the EAEU Agreement, the single market was expanded to include Armenia and Kyrgyzstan. The countries represent a market of some 180 million people and a combined GDP PPP of around $5 trillion.

Euroasian Economic Union has the tenth-largest economy in the world by nominal GDP and the fifth-largest by purchasing power parity.
Since the turn of the century, member states have experienced economic growth with GDP averaging 6% to 8% growth between 2000 and 2007, rising again in 2010 after the Financial crisis of 2007–08.
Since the establishment of the Eurasian Customs Union in 2010, trade between member states rose sharply. In 2011 mutual trade was $63 billion, 33.9% more than in 2010. In 2012, mutual trade was $68 billion and combined exports reached $594 billion, while imports were $341 billion. The first integration stage primarily enhanced trade among member states, bolstered economies and created a legal and institutional foundation for the member states. The second stage includes the free movements of goods, people, services and capital.

The Eurasian Economic Union is designed to reach a number of macroeconomic objectives such as reducing commodity prices by reducing the cost of transportation of raw materials, increasing return on new technologies and products due to the increased market volume, and promoting "healthy" competition in the common market. It is also designed to lower food prices, increase employment in industries and increase production capacity. EAEU members like Belarus and Kazakhstan (by its Nurly Zhol economic policy) seek to leverage the EAEU as a bridge between the European Union and the New Silk Road economic belt.

The Eurasian Union is considered as a major player in the world's energy sector, raw materials, arms industry and agricultural production. In 2013 Russia was the 3rd most successful country in the world in attracting capital from abroad.

Internal market

The core objective of the Single Economic Space is the development of a single market and achieving the "four freedoms", namely the free movements of goods, capital, services and people within the single market. The four freedoms came into effect on 1 January 2015 (the day the Eurasian Economic Union was officially established). The free movement of people means that citizens can move freely among member states to live, work, study or retire. Citizens of the member states of the union may travel to other member states on an internal passport. Although Russia also admits access to citizens of other CIS states without a passport, it is expected that after 2015 only citizens of the Customs Union will have this privilege.
Member states have a common external tariff on all goods entering the market and unified methods of valuing imported goods since the creation of the Eurasian Customs Union on 1 January 2010.
Objectives include joint coordination in the area of energy, industry, agriculture and transport.

Roughly 75% of Belarusian goods are exported, about half of which go to other member states. Trade within the union primarily consists of Belarusian machinery and agricultural products which are exported to Russia. Low gas prices from Russian energy producers are guaranteed to member states or countries wishing to join the union.

Competition
The Eurasian Economic Commission operates a competition policy to ensure equal competitive conditions in the commodity markets of the Single Economic Space. It also aims at harmonisation and improvement of legislation of each of the three countries in regard to competition policy. The commission serves as the competition regulator for the single market and is also responsible for antitrust issues. Special regulations limit state intervention in the economy.

Monetary union

Kazakhstani President Nursultan Nazarbayev had first proposed, in 2009, the creation of a common noncash currency called "yevraz" for the Eurasian Economic Community. It would have reportedly helped insulate the countries from the global economic crisis. In 2012, the idea of the new joint currency found support from Vladimir Putin and Dmitry Medvedev and by 2014 proposals were drafted in Eurasian Commission documents for the establishment of a Eurasian Central Bank and a common currency to be called the altyn which is to be introduced by 2025.

When discussing the Eurasian Economic Union, Vladimir Putin said the Eurasian Economic Union would include closer coordination of economic and monetary policy, including the use of a common currency in the future. Although the creation of a monetary union was not envisaged in the Eurasian Economic Union Treaty, Russian Prime Minister Dmitry Medvedev called for the introduction of a common currency for the Eurasian Economic Union. Leonid Slutsky, head of the State Duma's CIS committee, backed Medvedev's proposal to start discussions on the creation of a monetary union. Slutsky said it could be introduced shortly after 2015, when the union's structure becomes clear.
Belarusian president, Alexander Lukashenko, circulated the idea of creating a "new euro" for the Eurasian economic bloc. In April 2014, discussions to introduce a single currency resumed.

Russia's First Deputy Prime Minister, Igor Shuvalov, stated on 24 July 2014 that the Eurasian Economic Union will have a common currency unit in a span of five to ten years.

Energy
The Eurasian Economic Union is seen as an energy superpower, producing about 20.7% of the world's natural gas, and 14.6% of the world's oil and gas condensate in 2012, making it the world's top producer in both domains.
It is worth mentioning that these figures are mainly due to Russian Membership of EAEU, with Kazakhstan contributing 1.9% and 0.6% in gas and oil production respectively. Considerably small oil and gas reserved were discovered in Belarus while there are no such resources in Armenia. 
It also produces 9% of the world's electrical energy and 5.9% of the world's coal, making it the third and fourth producer in the world, respectively.
In Kazakhstan, energy is the leading economic sector. The country holds about 4 billion tons of proven recoverable oil reserves and 2,000 cubic kilometers (480 cu mi) of gas. Kazakhstan is the world's 17th largest oil exporter and the world's 23rd largest natural gas exporter.

Russia has the world's largest natural gas reserves, the 8th largest oil reserves, and the second largest coal reserves. Russia is also the world's leading natural gas exporter and the second largest natural gas producer, while also the largest oil exporter and the largest oil producer. While trade in oil and gas between resource-rich Russia and Kazakhstan is relatively low, the Belarus economy is heavily dependent on the access to the Russian hydrocarbons and - unlike the case with Kyrgyzstan and Armenia, Russia is Belarus's main trade partner accounting for 47% of all the trade. Belarus imports Russian crude oil (of which 45-50% were used for production of oil products to export) and natural gas (which were not directly re-exported) for the prices below the market ones, paying $173 for 1000 cubic meters of gas (for comparison - $250 for Armenia, $430 for Ukraine).

By 2019, Russia, Kazakhstan, Belarus and Armenia intend to create a common electricity market as well as a single hydrocarbons market by 2025. "With the creation of a single hydrocarbons market, we will have a deeper coordination that will allow us to be more competitive both in terms of pricing and in terms of getting high value added products in this very interesting and important market", stated Eurasian Commissioner Daniyal Akhmetov.

Infrastructure

The major economic centres are Moscow, Minsk and Astana. The distance between Moscow and Minsk is 717 kilometers, and the distance between Moscow and Astana is 2700 kilometers, making infrastructure a key challenge for the integration of member states. Major infrastructure projects began during the 2000s in order to modernise and connect the regional bloc to other markets, facilitating both integration and trade in the region. In 2007 Moscow announced it will invest US$1 trillion by 2020 to modernise the country's infrastructure.

Kazakhstan ranks favorably in terms of kilometres of road per inhabitant as other developed countries in the world have much less roadway per inhabitant.

Railways have been the primary way of linking countries in the Eurasian Economic Union since the 19th century. It has always been the main way of transport in the Russian Empire and the Soviet Union up until today. The union ranks 2nd in the world in terms of railway trackage (about 7.8% of the world's share). However it is still looking to improve cross-border trade within the union.

The Eurasian Development Bank has pledged to help in the construction of facilities to produce new generation freight cars and freight containers in Tikhvin, Russia and in Osipovichi, Belarus to respond to the increasing demand for rail transport. Projects have also been launched in Kazakhstan, as the landlocked country is highly dependent on railways for trade.

The most renowned railway in the union is the Trans-Siberian Railway which links the Russian Far East to Moscow. The Southern route also travels via Kazakhstan.

Single Eurasian Sky
The Single Eurasian Sky programme, administered by the Eurasian Economic Commission, outlines the creation of a single market for air services and a single air traffic zone. The single air traffic zone would make it easier for airlines to draw up new flight paths, thereby increasing the number of flights flying through the region. Eurasian Commissioner, Daniyal Akhmetov, said that it would be created on a step-by-step basis. In June 2014, Belarusian Airline Belavia stated that it was ready to move towards the development of the Single Eurasian Sky. The terms and conditions of operation in the common aviation market have not yet been agreed on. However, the project is likely to be modelled on the European Union's Single European Sky. The project will reportedly help turn the airspace of the Eurasian Union into a popular transit hub between Europe and Southeast Asia. "We should understand that currently, the aviation companies of Kazakhstan and Belarus are not able to compete with Russia's aviation companies. Therefore, the programme will envisage a phasing, creating a competitive environment and so on", Eurasian Commissioner Akhmetov said.

Agriculture

The Eurasian Economic Union is the top producer of sugar beet and sunflower, producing 18.6% of the world's sugar beet and 22.7% of the world's sunflowers in 2012, as well as a top producer of rye, barley, buckwheat, oats and sunflower seed. It is also a large producer of potatoes, wheat and grain (and grain legumes).

Part of the competences of the Eurasian Economic Commission are agriculture subsidies. It is responsible for the coordination of agricultural policy-making between member states and ensuring collective food security. 
The Eurasian Development Bank finances projects to further integration and develop agriculture. It has disbursed approximately US$470 million for projects between 2008 and 2013.

Projected economic impact

Member states remain optimistic of the union and key partners in the region, namely China, Iran, Turkey remain interested in it. A common belief is that the Eurasian Economic Union has significant potential over the next two decades, with experts predicting a 25 percent growth in the member states' GDP by 2030, which equates to over US$600 billion. The agreement will give member state citizens access to employment and education across the union. It will also entail collaborative policies in many sectors, including agriculture, energy, technology and transportation. These collaborative policies are particularly interesting for countries in Asia seeking access to energy, trade routes in Central Asia and Siberia, and agricultural goods.

Former president Dmitry Medvedev of Russia stated that both the positive and negative experiences of the European Union will be taken into account and argued that the Eurasian Union will avoid the problems of economic gaps and disparity between countries, such as those found in the eurozone, since the member countries have a comparable level of economic development, as well as common history and values.

The European Union and the United States as well as other western countries remain critical of the Eurasian Economic Union, with analysts stating that without modernisation and real economic reforms, the union will have little impact. The popular magazine The Economist stated that the advantages of joining the union remain unclear and further remarked "The agreement was vague, with technical details left unresolved, making it a political show rather than an economic one". Outlets have also stated that without Ukraine, the Eurasian Economic Union has lost a key member state necessary to the success of the union. Bloomberg's business magazine, Businessweek has affirmed that joining Putin's Eurasian Union looks like a bad deal, including for Russia. The union "won't really register on the radar of the global economy," said an analyst at the EU's Institute for Security Studies in Paris. Moreover, one research states that so far EAEU was not able to contribute to economic growth in Armenia - quite the contrary, it significantly slowed the economic performance of the country.

Free trade agreements

In force since 2012, the multilateral CIS Free Trade Zone Agreement establishes a free trade area between Armenia, Belarus, Kazakhstan, Kyrgyzstan, Russia (now all EAEU member states), as well as Ukraine, Uzbekistan, Moldova and Tajikistan. Russia has suspended the Agreement with respect to Ukraine from 1 January 2016, following the provisional application of the DCFTA between the European Union and Ukraine.

The Union has signed a first free trade agreement with Vietnam, which is planned to enter into force in October 2016 following the ratification by all the parties.

Having completed a free trade agreement (FTA) feasibility study for Vietnam in November 2012 the then Customs Union, which later became the EAEU, decided to proceed with negotiations. The negotiations over the FTA began in early 2013 and lasted approximately two years – on 29 May 2015 the agreement was signed by Prime Ministers of all the parties to be later ratified by the parties. Trade between Vietnam and the Customs Union in 2011 was US$2.24 billion.

Russia's economic development minister stated that the Turkish economic minister, Nihat Zeybekci, put forward an initiative for closer cooperation with the Eurasian Economic Union, including the formation of a free trade zone between the union and Turkey.

As announced by Russian Deputy Prime Minister Arkady Dvorkovich on 9 December 2013, Israel is considering starting free trade negotiations with the Eurasian Economic Union. The feasibility study was conducted between the two parties and the decision was made to proceed with free trade negotiations, which are expected to start before the end of 2016. Experts believe the negotiations will take around 2 to 3 years to finish.

Russian President Vladimir Putin stated at a July 2014 meeting of ambassadors and permanent representatives of the Russian Federation that he was ready to discuss a free trade area between the European Union and the Eurasian Economic Union.

In February 2015, Egyptian president Abdel Fattah al-Sisi announced his country would sign a free trade agreement with the Eurasian Union. The preliminary feasibility study has been conducted and the decision to launch negotiation process is expected to be made before the end of 2016.

There have been discussions on free trade negotiations with over 30 countries, some of them resulting in the preliminary feasibility studies. Such feasibility studies have been conducted with India and the Republic of Korea.

In May 2015, the Union gave the initial go-ahead to signing a free trade agreement with Iran. Described as the EAEU's "key partner in the Middle East" by Andrey Slepnev, Minister for trade on the Eurasian Economic Commission board in an expert-level EAEU meeting in Yerevan, Viktor Khristenko furthermore noted that Iran is an important partner for all the EAEU member states. He stated that "Cooperation between the EAEU and Iran is an important area of our work in strengthening the economic stability of the region". In December 2015 a "temporary Agreement" was signed between Iran and the EAEU, which Commissioner Andrey Slepnev characterized as the "first step toward the materialization of free trade between Iran and the Union".

One of the key initiatives in the field of free trade and economic cooperation is the proposal on "linking" the Eurasian economic integration and China's strategic "Silk Road Economic Belt" project. The relevant communique was signed by Russia's Vladimir Putin and China's Xi Jinping on 8 March 2015. While the "linking" mostly is understood as support for infrastructure investments, there are ongoing negotiations between the EAEU and China on a "trade and economic agreement" in order to build "an open economic architecture without a political component, oriented on business and reducing barriers".

Pivot to Asia
The union is actively seeking to increase trade with East Asia. It commenced talks for official trade cooperation with ASEAN. Officials of both unions discussed opportunities for developing cooperation between them. 
The South Korean president launched a "Eurasian Initiative", which seeks to connect transportation, electrical, gas and oil links from Western Europe to East Asia. The initiative echoes China's long-standing "New Silk Road" project.
The members of the union agreed to step up talks with Vietnam on creating a free trade zone, to strengthen cooperation with China, including in information exchange on goods and services, and to set up expert groups to develop preferential trade regimes with Israel and India.

Russia

The European Council on Foreign Relations and analysts suggest the Eurasian Union includes strategic interests as well as economic interests for its member states, especially Russia. In order to link both Europe and East Asia, Russia seeks to develop its eastern regions to increase its access to Asian markets. Russia's Far East has gained even more importance due to its proximity to alternative markets since the European Union and United States imposed sanctions on Russia following the crisis in Ukraine.

China's rise as a major trading partner has been cited as a potential reason for Russia's loss of control over Central Asian economies. The union is seen as a way to counterbalance China's growing trade in Central Asia and the European Union's Eastern Partnership.

As the trade bloc seeks to profit from the growing economies of East Asia, Russia has made steps to develop its eastern territories, Siberia and the Russian Far East. However, the development of the Russian Far East may face difficulties due to Russia's traditional orientation towards Europe and the region's backward infrastructure and underdeveloped economy. In 2012 Russian President Vladimir Putin called for Russia to "catch the Chinese wind in the sails of the Russian economy". During the same year, a Ministry for the Development of the Russian Far East was established and the country hosted a summit of the Asia-Pacific Economic Cooperation forum (APEC) in its eastern city of Vladivostok. The country also began striking deals and undertook massive efforts to improve infrastructure in its eastern territories.
Russia's pivot to Asia included the important task of creating a Eurasian trade bloc. The countries seek to increase their competitiveness by sustaining domestic development and defending their interests in the region.
An estimated 76% of Russia's exports depend on resources extracted (or manufactured) in Siberia. In order to transport goods from East Asia to Europe, they must be transported through Siberia by rail. Hence, the region plays an important role in trade. However, it remains less developed than Russia's western regions and modernisation plans are ongoing.

In 2013 the Russian government announced it would spend 450 billion roubles (US$14 billion) for the modernisation of the Trans-Siberian and Baikal-Amur railways. Russian President Vladimir Putin called the Trans-Siberian railway the country's "strategically vital transport artery". In July 2013 he stated "Rail freight traffic to our Far East ports has increased by 55 percent over the last 5 years and now comes to around 110 million tons a year". Projects to upgrade stations at the border with Mongolia, China and North Korea were also undertaken the same year.

In 2016, Putin calls on Eurasian Economic Union, China, India, Pakistan, Iran and the CIS to join "Greater Eurasian Partnership".

Some experts also see the union as a way to curtail the loss of Russian influence in Central Asia. Russian politicians have voiced their concerns over Russia's long southern borders and the challenges it may pose. By creating a regional trade bloc to keep its neighbours in Central Asia stable, Russia hopes to find securing its own borders easier.

Kazakhstan

Neighbouring Kazakhstan has replicated Russia's attempt to access East Asian markets. In September 2013, the presidents of China and Kazakhstan signed commercial deals and launched China's "New Silk Road". On 20 May 2014, both presidents announced they would link Kazakhstan's railways to the Pacific Ocean by opening a new terminal in the Chinese port city of Lianyungang. China also signed agreements to make further investments in Kazakhstan's energy sector. Both countries announced they would put aside US$1 billion to modernise an oil refinery in Shymkent and a further US$150 million to open a new oil and gas plant near Almaty. 
The president of Kazakhstan also held talks with the heads of Chinese corporations and agreed to cooperate in the areas of aircraft production, telecommunication and mining.

Demographics

The combined population of all member states is 183,319,693 as of 2015.

The Eurasian Economic Union has 17 cities with more than 1 million inhabitants, the largest being Moscow. The most densely populated areas are the capital cities of member states and European Russia. Siberia is the region with the least inhabitants. In Russia about 160 different ethnic groups and indigenous peoples live within the country's borders. Kazakhstan and Belarus are home to sizable ethnic Russian minorities.
Though the member states of the Eurasian Economic Union's populations are comparatively large, its density is low because of the enormous size of Russia and Kazakhstan.
The Eurasian Economic Union's average birth rate in 2010 was roughly 12.5 births per 1000 people, higher than the European Union, which has an average of 9.90 births per 1000 people.

Languages
According to Article 110 of the Treaty on the Eurasian Economic Union (2014) the Russian language is the working language of the 'Bodies of the Union'.

Foreign affairs
The Eurasian Economic Union mainly uses its arms industry, raw materials, gas and oil reserves, and railways as its key assets for trade with foreign countries.

Economic partners
The Eurasian Economic Union must negotiate as a whole to sign free trade agreements with other countries. Key players for the Eurasian Economic Union are the European Union, Turkey, Iran, China and the Korean peninsula. The EAEU has sought to increase its trade with partners in the Middle East and East Asia in order to profit from the growing trade between Europe and Asia.

Tensions with the European Union in 2014 have led both unions to pressure post-Soviet states to join their integration unions. Both sides have accused each other of carving spheres of influence. Members of the union, especially Russia have tried to diversify their trade by signing economic agreements with China, Iran and Turkey. Trade with North and South Korea has also risen.

A rising China has been increasingly interested in Central Asia and the Eurasian Economic Union. Analysts see the union as a potential way China could facilitate its investments in the region. Historically, China held close economic ties with many countries throughout Eurasia. Under the Han Dynasty, its trade routes extended to the Roman Empire. The Economy of the Han Dynasty and other subsequent dynasties exchanged numerous goods with countries throughout Europe and Asia. Both China and the union have stated they would benefit from recreating trade routes modelled on the historic Silk Road.

Railways transport goods from China to the European Union through Kazakhstan and Russia. The country has pushed for the construction of more railway lines to connect Berlin to east China to reduce shipping time. It proposed major high-speed railway lines going towards Europe via Russia and Kazakhstan and another through the Middle East via Tajikistan, a potential future member for the union. China has signed numerous energy deals with Russia and Kazakhstan, as it tries to move from coal to less pollutant alternatives.

Iran has sought to diversify its economy as well, seeing the EAEU and China as key economic partners. Relations between Russia and Iran have increased as both countries are under U.S. sanctions and are seeking new trade partners. in 2014 the two countries signed a historic US$20 billion energy deal. A free trade agreement between Iran and the Eurasian Economic Union came into force on 27 October 2019.

Kazakhstan seeks to enhance its ties with Turkey, a key player in the region. In July 2014, Turkey announced closer economic ties with the EAEU, including a possible free trade agreement in the near future.

Armenia and Nagorno-Karabakh

In September 2013, Armenia announced its intentions of joining the Customs Union of Belarus, Kazakhstan and Russia. At the time of joining the Union, the Republic of Armenia already had preferential treatment within the framework of the CIS as a party to the Free Trade Zone Agreement of 18 October 2011, and therefore enjoyed significant tariff benefits. According to an IMF representative in Armenia, Armenia's membership to the Eurasian Economic Union resulted in about $250 million a year in customs revenue. Armenia also benefited in the form of secured privileges for 752 products until 2020, which implies no EAEU tariffs due to Union membership. Joining the Union allowed the country to get even more tangible economic effects due to the functioning of the Common Economic Space, the use of common technical regulation, sanitary and phytosanitary measures, non-tariff regulation. Such results confirm that for the implementation of full-scale freedom of movement of goods, liberalization of tariff regulation alone is not enough. The region of Nagorno-Karabakh, however, is disputed between Armenia and Azerbaijan. Tensions rose further in the Caucasus region on 30 July 2014 due to clashes between Armenian and Azerbaijani soldiers.

Experts estimate that with the accession of Armenia, the internationally unrecognised Nagorno-Karabakh Republic would not be integrated into the Eurasian Union. Armenia is a permanent political, military and economic ally of Russia, whereas Azerbaijan holds close ties with Armenia's long-standing enemy Turkey. The Kazakh President Nursultan Nazarbayev expressed concern in 2013 that no reliable customs border between Armenia and Nagorno-Karabakh could be drawn. However, Nazarbayev expressed that he holds all the existing disagreements preventing Armenia's integration into Eurasian Economic Union are surmountable. The Chairman of the Foreign Policy Committee in the Armenian Parliament, Artak Zakarian, announced on 14 May 2014 that Armenia will not build any customs borders, including with the region of Nagorno-Karabakh.

According to Eurasian Economic Commission statistics, Eurasian Economic Union countries experienced a 1.9% GDP increase between January-June 2018, compared to the same period in 2017. Armenia had the greatest GDP growth index throughout the reporting period - 8.3%. The EEU's industrial output increased by 3.3%, with reprocessing industry increasing by 62.7% and mining increasing by 27.9%. Again, Armenia had the largest growth in industrial production - 9.6% - despite a 12.7% fall in mining.

Uzbekistan, Tajikistan and Kyrgyzstan

Previously, Tajikistan was on track to become a potential member of the union, having signed the treaty on the Eurasian Customs Union and the Single Economic Space. However, due to border disputes between Kyrgyzstan and Tajikistan, the integration process in Tajikistan has stalled. Both countries exchanged fire in December 2013 and August 2014, which resulted in casualties. Both countries have since announced they would resolve conflicts and improve border cooperation. Officials hope to make significant progress by the end of 2015. In March 2020, Uzbekistan announced that it wished to become a Eurasian Union observer state.

International response

Former European commissioner José Manuel Barroso stated at the World Economic Forum that the EU supports the regional integration, including the Eurasian Union. He also praised Kazakhstan for joining the bloc. He criticized the post-Soviet space, saying "the integration in the region is not sufficient". However, he warned that the Russo-Ukrainian War is a major obstacle to good cooperation between the EU and the Eurasian Union.

Tensions between the EAEU and the European Union (EU) occurred as both have sought to deepen their ties with several former Soviet republics. The EU has signed free trade agreements with Ukraine, Moldova and Georgia. However, separatists in all three countries back closer ties with Russia. Ukraine planned to sign an EU association agreement in 2013,  but abruptly cancelled the signing under Russian pressure to join the EAEU. This led to mass protests against Ukraine's president, with the EU supporting a failed political settlement before president Yanukovych fled to Russia, and Russia then annexing the Crimean peninsula (following a disputed referendum) and supporting separatists in Eastern Ukraine. In response, some member states of the European Union have sought to find alternatives to Russian gas, while others have voiced their support for the construction of the South Stream pipeline which circumvents Ukraine. Later the already started construction of the pipeline, under US sanctions on Russia and pressure on EU, the project was abandoned. Analysts believe Russia backs the Eurasian Economic Union in order to limit western influence in the region.

Western analysts generally see the Eurasian Economic Union as a way to reunite many of the former Soviet republics. For example, Washington Post author Abigail Hauslohner wrote the treaty was intended "to further bolster [Russia]'s ties to former Soviet republics." The United States expressed its opposition to the Eurasian Union, claiming it is "an attempt" to re-establish a USSR-type union among the former Soviet republics. In December 2012, former Secretary of State Hillary Clinton claimed "It's not going to be called that [Soviet Union]. It's going to be called customs union, it will be called the Eurasian Union and all of that, but let's make no mistake about it. We know what the goal is and we are trying to figure out effective ways to slow down or prevent it".

Kazakhstan's president Nursultan Nazarbayev called it "a hard-won achievement" and "a blessing for our people." Public support in Kazakhstan for the country's accession to the EAEU stood at 68% in June 2014, with 5.5% opposed.

Thailand, Iran, New Zealand, Tunisia, Turkey, and Vietnam are among the countries that expressed a desire to conclude trade agreements with the new Eurasian Economic Union after the treaty was signed. In 2018, the Faroe Islands signed a new memorandum of understanding with the EEU. The MoU is designed to boost trade and cooperation between the two sides.

Existing integration projects

The Eurasian Customs Union has already brought partial economic integration between the three states, and the Eurasian Economic Union is said to be a continuation of this customs union. However, the impact or legacy of that agreement is unclear – trade between the three states actually fell 13% during the agreement's first year.

A number of other regional organisations also provide the basis for further integration: the Union State of Russia and Belarus; the Collective Security Treaty Organisation, consisting of Armenia, Belarus, Kazakhstan, Kyrgyzstan, Russia and Tajikistan; and the Commonwealth of Independent States comprising most of the post-Soviet countries.

See also

ASEAN
Collective Security Treaty Organization
Comecon
Community for Democracy and Rights of Nations
Enlargement of the Eurasian Economic Union
Eurasian Economic Community
Eurasian Patent Convention
Eurasian Patent Organisation
Eurasianism
Soviet Union
Union of Sovereign States
Union State
Warsaw Pact
List of multilateral free-trade agreements

Notes and references

Footnotes

Journal articles and studies

Online sources

External links

Eurasian Economic Union (EAEU)
Eurasian Economic Commission (EEC)
Legal portal of the Eurasian Economic Union (EAEU)

 
2015 establishments in Asia
2015 establishments in Europe
2015 establishments in Russia
Articles containing video clips
Economic Union
Continental unions
Economy of Armenia
Economy of Belarus
Economy of Kazakhstan
Economy of Russia
Multilateral relations of Russia
Organizations established in 1994
Organizations based in Russia
Organizations established in 2015
Post-Soviet alliances
Post-Soviet states
Trade blocs
United Nations General Assembly observers